Powers Lake is a census-designated place (CDP) in the towns of Randall and Wheatland, in Kenosha County in the U.S. state of Wisconsin. As of the 2020 census, the CDP had a population of 1,401. Part of the Powers Lake CDP was in Walworth County, but on December 20, 2011, it became part of the village of Bloomfield.

History
Originally called Lakeville and then Nippersink, Powers Lake was named after James B. Powers, one of its early settlers, convivial neighbor, and one of our first postmasters. The farming community appreciated our fertile Wisconsin soil and access to a water supply.Recreational activities garnered interest around the lakes in the 1880’s, but it was in the 1890’s that fishermen and others, primarily from Chicago, enjoyed long visits in the area and eventually developed the North Shore of Powers Lake. Ice companies also ‘mined’ the south shores of Powers Lake and the north shore of Benedict Lake in the 1890’s, eventually establishing five ice houses on Powers Lake.

Geography
Powers Lake is located at 42°32'20" North, 88°17'53" West (42.538813, -88.298027).

According to the United States Census Bureau, the CDP has a total area of 3.1 square miles (8.0 km2), of which, 2.2 square miles (5.7 km2) of it is land and 0.9 square miles (2.2 km2) of it is water. The total area is 27.88% water.

Demographics

As of the census of 2000, there were 1,500 people, 544 households, and 405 families residing in the CDP. The racial makeup of the CDP was 97.53% White, 0.33% African American, 0.13% Native American, 0.27% Asian, 0.00% Pacific Islander, 0.07% from other races, and 1.67% from two or more races. 2.13% of the population were Hispanic or Latino of any race.

There were 544 households, out of which 38.2% had children under the age of 18 living with them, 59.6% were married couples living together, 10.8% had a female householder with no husband present, and 25.4% were non-families. 20.0% of all households were made up of individuals, and 7.7% had someone living alone who was 65 years of age or older. The average household size was 2.73 and the average family size was 3.15.

In the CDP, the population was spread out, with 28.5% under the age of 18, 6.6% from 18 to 24, 32.3% from 25 to 44, 21.2% from 45 to 64, and 11.5% who were 65 years of age or older. The median age was 36 years. For every 100 females, there were 98.4 males. For every 100 females age 18 and over, there were 92.6 males.

The median income for a household in the CDP was $53,403, and the median income for a family was $53,264. Males had a median income of $42,000 versus $26,736 for females. The per capita income for the CDP was $22,766. 7.4% of the population and 6.6% of families were below the poverty line. 3.0% of those under the age of 18 and 9.7% of those 65 and older were living below the poverty line.

Organizations

Powers Lake has many groups and organizations, including the Powers Lake Yacht Club, which has been sailing on these waters for many years.  A more recent organization is the Powers Lake Boat Club, a younger group of boaters, skiers, and partiers. Powers Lake is also home to Team Pup N Suds, a casual inline skating team.

References

External links
 District of Powers Lake

Census-designated places in Kenosha County, Wisconsin
Census-designated places in Wisconsin